BOBBY is the debut studio album by the band of the same name, released in 2011 on Partisan Records.  Consequence of Sound said of the album, "Its delicate balance between calm and eerie provides a nice escape from the drums, guitar, and bass formula, assuring that BOBBY’s atypical sound will reserve a place for the group among their peers at the synth-folk table for some time to come."

Track listing

References

2011 albums
Bobby (band) albums
Partisan Records albums